The horned clubtail (Arigomphus cornutus) is a clubtail dragonfly of Canada and the United States.

It has a greenish thorax with black stripes and a black abdomen with a light stripe along the top. It has blue eyes and black legs. It also has distinctive wide forked yellow claspers shaped like cow horns and a large sloped bridge between the eyes.

The horned clubtail lives in ponds and sluggish streams. Its range includes Canada and several U.S. states:
Colorado
Iowa
Minnesota
Montana – Carter, Custer, Fallon, Powder River, and Wibaux Counties; only in artificial reservoirs.
Nebraska – Cherry and Cuming Counties
New York – (rarely)
North Dakota
South Dakota
Wisconsin
Wyoming

References

Gomphidae
Odonata of North America
Insects described in 1900